Pound–Hitchins House, also known as “Mount Providence” and Ruhlmann House, is a historic home located at Lockport, Niagara County, New York. It was built about 1833, and is a two-story, five bay, Greek Revival style dwelling with a large two-story wing. It has a side gable roof,  end chimneys, and is constructed of large-block ashlar Gasport limestone.  It features an elaborate central entry with an original six panel wood door recessed slightly behind two engaged Ionic order columns in antis with sidelights and panels.

It was listed on the National Register of Historic Places in 2015.

References

Houses on the National Register of Historic Places in New York (state)
Greek Revival houses in New York (state)
Houses completed in 1833
Houses in Niagara County, New York
National Register of Historic Places in Niagara County, New York